Sir Ernest William Elsmie Holderness, 2nd Baronet CBE (13 March 1890 – 23 August 1968) was an English amateur golfer and one of the Holderness baronets. He won The Amateur Championship in 1922 and 1924 and the Golf Illustrated Gold Vase in 1925. He played in the Walker Cup in 1923, 1926, and 1930.

Tournament wins
1922 The Amateur Championship
1924 The Amateur Championship
1925 Golf Illustrated Gold Vase

Major championships

Amateur wins (2)

Results timeline

Note: Holderness only played in the Amateur Championship.

NT = No tournament
"T" indicates a tie for a place
R256, R128, R64, R32, R16, QF, SF = Round in which player lost in match play

Sources:  The Glasgow Herald, May 20, 1914, pg. 12., The Glasgow Herald, June 10, 1920, pg. 9.,
The American Golfer, June 4, 1921, pg. 24.,
The Glasgow Herald, May 10, 1923, pg. 15.,
The Glasgow Herald, May 26, 1925, pg. 15.,
The Glasgow Herald, May 27, 1926, pg. 7.,  The Glasgow Herald, May 24, 1928, pg. 3.

Team appearances
Walker Cup (representing Great Britain): 1923, 1926, 1930
Great Britain vs USA (representing Great Britain): 1921
England–Scotland Amateur Match (representing England): 1922, 1923, 1924 (winners), 1925 (winners), 1926 (winners), 1928 (winners)

References

English male golfers
Amateur golfers
Baronets in the Baronetage of the United Kingdom
Commanders of the Order of the British Empire
1890 births
1968 deaths